The family Freytag von Loringhoven is a noble family that originated in Uradel in Westphalia. The surname is also spelled Vrydach, Frydag, Freydag and various other slightly different spellings.

History 
The surname was first documented in 1198 and 1217.

At the end of the 13th century, Westphalian nobles, including members of the Freytags, moved to Prussia and Livonia to fight for and with the Teutonic Order to spread Christianity.

Notable members

 Arndt Freytag von Loringhoven (1956-), diplomat
 Bernd von Freytag-Loringhoven (1914–2007), Baltic German general
 Elsa von Freytag-Loringhoven (1874–1927), Dada artist and poet.
 Evert Baron Freytag von Loringhoven, Righteous Among the Nations
 Hugo von Freytag-Loringhoven (1855–1924), German general and military historian
 Johann von Freytag-Loringhoven (1483–1494) Master (Landmeister) of the Livonian Order
 Wessel von Freytag-Loringhoven (1899–1944), Baltic German member of the resistance against Adolf Hitler
 Lieutenant Baron von Freytag-Loringhoven, died in a 1911 plane crash

References 

Baltic nobility
German noble families
Baltic-German people
Westphalian nobility
Compound surnames